Sogn og Fjordane County Municipality was the regional governing administration of the old Sogn og Fjordane county in Norway. The county municipality was established in its current form on 1 January 1976 when the law was changed to allow elected county councils in Norway. The county municipality was dissolved on 1 January 2020, when Sogn og Fjordane was merged with the neighboring Hordaland county, creating the new Vestland county which is led by the Vestland County Municipality. 

The main responsibilities of the county municipality included the running of 12 upper secondary schools with 4,500 pupils. It also administrates the county roadways, public transport, dental care, culture, and cultural heritage.

County government
The Sogn og Fjordane county council is made up of 31 representatives that were elected every four years. The council essentially acted as a Parliament or legislative body for the county and it met several times each year. The council is divided into standing committees and an executive board which meet considerably more often. Both the council and executive board are led by the County Mayor who held the executive powers of the county. Jenny Følling of the Centre Party was the last County Mayor.

County council
The party breakdown of the council is as follows:

Regional reform 2020
In 2020, Sogn og Fjordane merged with neighbouring Hordaland to form Vestland county municipality. The merger was part of a larger reform in local and regional administration initiated by the national government, which will see the number of county municipalities fall from 19 to 11.

Location
The administrative seat was located at the village of Leikanger in Leikanger municipality where all of the county offices are located except for the cultural division, which is located in the town of Førde. Tore Eriksen is chief-of-administration. Traditionally, the county administration was said to be in the village of Hermansverk, which was regarded as the administrative seat, but Hermansverk and the neighboring village of Leikanger have grown together and form one large village, and now the administrative seat is said to be Leikanger even though the buildings are still in the same place.

Transport

The county previously owned the transportation company Fylkesbaatane i Sogn og Fjordane, which operated ferry services throughout the county. In 2001, Fylkesbaatane merged with the Møre og Romsdal County Municipality-owned Møre og Romsdal Fylkesbåtar to create the new company Fjord1, of which Sogn og Fjordane County Municipality remains a majority shareholder.

References

 
Sogn og Fjordane
County municipalities of Norway
1838 establishments in Norway
2020 disestablishments in Norway